An Acrobat's Heart is a solo album by Annette Peacock. Her first release after a absence of over ten years, it was recorded during January and April 2000 at Rainbow Studio in Oslo, Norway, and was issued later that year by ECM Records. On the album, Peacock is joined by members of the Cikada String Quartet.

The album was recorded in response to a commission from ECM's Manfred Eicher to write music for voice, piano, and strings. Peacock reflected: "I told him I'd never written for string quartet, and he said that was fine with him. So I thought 'OK, go for it'. I heard [in my mind] this string quartet which was just pure sound, just bow on string... And I thought... yes!"

Reception

Stacia Proefrock of AllMusic gave the album three stars out of five, stating, "this album proves that after over three decades as a performer, Annette Peacock still has the skill to compose and execute truly beautiful music."

A reviewer for All About Jazz commented: "'An Acrobat's Heart' is cause for celebration, not only for the re-emergence of Peacock and the reminder of her originality, but also for the consistent and influential statement that she makes, sparingly and powerfully."

Entertainment Weeklys Josef Woodard called the music "a hypnotically tender and ethereal song cycle," and wrote: "Hinting at jazz and chamber music, her private musical language is a bittersweet waking dream of a project, and a welcome return."

In an article for The New York Times, Giovanni Russonello remarked: "The songs... feel like Tin Pan Alley ballads cut open, made into dark dreams. Her voice is like thick smoke, somewhere between a mutter and a purr."

Tom Terrell of JazzTimes wrote: "Less is more than enough for Peacock's exquisitely strange and haunting songs about love..., loneliness..., obsession..., fear and fearlessness... Peacock's smoky alto rarely rises above a whisper, and she phrases silence like Miles."

A writer for Jazzed Magazine stated: "the album is typically spare and strikingly lyrical, yet no more conventionally jazz-like in intent as any of her earlier work. Still, it wouldn't be much of a surprise to find discerning jazz musicians rediscovering these tunes somewhere down the line. Quality, even from the least ordinary of artists, has a strange way of resurfacing."

Track listing
All compositions and string arrangements by Annette Peacock
 "Mia's Proof" – 5:24
 "Tho" – 5:24
 "Weightless" – 4:42
 "Over" – 3:52
 "As Long as Now" – 3:49
 "U Slide" – 4:17
 "B 4 U Said" – 4:42
 "The Heart Keeps" – 3:08
 "Ways It Isn't" – 3:50
 "Unspoken" – 2:59
 "Safe" – 3:29
 "Free the Memory" – 4:36
 "Ever 2 B Gotten" – 2:53
 "Camille" – 4:50
 "Lost at Last" – 2:18

Personnel
Annette Peacock - vocal, pianoThe Cikada String Quartet:''''' 
Henrik Hannisdal, Odd Hannisdal - violin
Marek Konstantynowicz - viola
Morten Hannisdal - cello

References

2000 albums
ECM Records albums
Annette Peacock albums
Albums produced by Manfred Eicher